The Port of Shantou is a natural river seaport on the coast of the city of Shantou, Guangdong Province, People's Republic of China. It is the only major port in eastern Guangdong, and the gateway to the Shantou SEZ. In 2012, it had a throughput of 45.6 million tons of cargo, and 1,250,000 TEU of containers. Like most Chinese seaports, it has experienced frantic growth in the last two decades and has plans for large expansion in the future.

History
Shantou was one of the Treaty Ports opened by the Treaties of Tientsin in 1858. British and American consulates were established on Mayu Island.

Layout
The Port of Shantou is located in the estuary of the Rongjiang river (榕江), opening to the South China Sea. As of 2012 it had 86 berths, 18 of which were deep-water berths capable of handling ships over 10,000 DWT.

Shantou Port has eight port areas.
The Old Port Area
Zhuchi Port Area is the main port area as of 2013.
Mashan Port Area
Guang'ao Port Area
Haimen Port Area
Nan'ao Port Area Located on Nan'ao island on Qianjiang Bay
Rongjiang Port Area
Tianxin Port Area: Under planning

Administration

Operations

References

External links
Port of Shantou website

Ports and harbours of China